Belon'i Tsiribihina (also known as Belo sur Tsiribihina or Belo - Tsiribihina) is a town and commune in Madagascar. It belongs to the district of Belo sur Tsiribihina, which is a part of Menabe Region. It is situated at the mouth of the Tsiribihina River. 
The population of the commune was estimated to be approximately 72,000 in 2001 commune census.

Belon'i Tsiribihina is served by a local airport. In addition to primary schooling the town offers secondary education at both junior and senior levels. The town provides access to hospital services to its citizens.

The majority 60% of the population of the commune are farmers, while an additional 20% receives their livelihood from raising livestock. The most important crop is rice, while other important products are beans and chickpea.  Services provide employment for 10% of the population. Additionally fishing employs 10% of the population.

See also
Tsingy de Bemaraha Strict Nature Reserve
Madagascar dry deciduous forests
Tsiribihina River

References and notes 

Populated places in Menabe
Tsiribihina River